Dalo Department is a department or commune of Ziro Province in southern Burkina Faso. The administrative seat is the village of Dalo. The population of the department was 10,746 in 2006.

Towns and villages
The department is composed of six villages, including the administrative seat, listed with preliminary 2006 population figures:

Notes

Departments of Burkina Faso
Ziro Province